The Next Generation Missile (NGM), formerly the Joint Dual Role Air Dominance Missile (JDRADM), was a proposed Beyond-visual-range (BVR) air-to-air missile (AAM) capable of all weather day and night performance, to replace the AIM-120 AMRAAM and AGM-88 HARM.  It was proposed to be cancelled in the Obama Administration's 2013 budget request.  A parallel project, the T-3 (Triple Target Terminator) program has continued.  The T-3 missile is aimed at three major targets - enemy aircraft, cruise missiles and air defence networks.

See also
 Meteor (missile)
 List of missiles
 Missile designation

References

Air-to-air missiles of the United States
Proposed weapons of the United States